Ryan Caldwell (born 1 September 1984) is a former Irish rugby union footballer. He last played for Exeter Chiefs in the English Premiership. Caldwell joined Ulster on a development contract in 2003 following a successful spell in the province's academy. He joined Bath before the 2011–12 season where he played for three seasons.

He made his full Ireland debut against The Barbarians on 27 May 2008 in an uncapped match at Kingsholm Stadium in Gloucester and received his first cap as a sub against Canada on 23 May 2009 in Vancouver.

In 2007 Caldwell was named in the IRFU's High Performance Select Group. Caldwell has been named in Ireland's Churchill Cup squad in both 2007 and 2008. He signed a 2-year contract for Bath Rugby for the 2011–12 season. On 28 May 2014, Caldwell signed for West County rivals Exeter Chiefs on a one-year contract for the 2014–15 season.

References

External links
Ulster profile
Bath Rugby profile

Living people
1984 births
Dungannon RFC players
Ulster Rugby players
Bath Rugby players
Exeter Chiefs players
Irish rugby union players
Ireland international rugby union players
Ireland Wolfhounds international rugby union players
Rugby union players from Belfast
Rugby union locks